Antonio Caimi (16 April 1814 – 5 January 1878) was an Italian painter and biographer of artists, active in Milan and best known for his portraits.

Biography
He was born at Sondrio. He trained initially in the Accademia Carrara of Bergamo under Diotti, but then moved to study in the Brera Academy under Sabatelli.

He  was chiefly engaged as a portrait painter, but also painted The Beheading of St. John the Baptist and  The Return from Babylon. He wrote a work on The Arts of Design, and the Lombardian Artists from 1777 to 1862 published in Milan in 1862. He was secretary of the Brera Academy at Milan from 1860 until his death in that city.

References

1814 births
1878 deaths
People from Sondrio
19th-century Italian painters
Italian male painters
Painters from Milan
Italian art historians
Academic staff of Brera Academy
19th-century Italian male artists